Jane Diane Lomax-Smith, AM (born 19 June 1950, in the United Kingdom) is an Australian politician and histopathologist who has been the Lord Mayor of the City of Adelaide since 14 November 2022. She was previously in local government for nine years (1991 to 2000), as a councillor for three terms and Lord Mayor of Adelaide for two terms (1997 to 2000). She was elected to the South Australian House of Assembly seat of Adelaide representing the Labor Party from 2002 to 2010, and throughout this time was a Minister of Education and Tourism and a range of other portfolios. In 2010–2011, she was the Interim Director of the Royal Institution of Australia (RiAus). Since 2011, she has been the chair of the Board of the South Australian Museum.

Early life and career
Lomax-Smith was born in Walthamstow in the East End of London, in the United Kingdom. She attended the Woodford County High School Grammar School, and received a grant to attend the London Hospital Medical College, in Whitechapel, where she obtained her medical degree (BSc MBBS) and BSc(Hons). After migrating to Australia, she was made FRCPA (Fellow of the Royal College of Pathologists of Australasia) in 1984 and received a Ph.D. from the University of Adelaide in 1985 on "IgA Nephropathy and Liver Disease". Before entering politics she was a clinical pathologist, medical researcher and teacher.
In 2017 she was awarded an honorary DSc by the University of Adelaide.

Political career
Lomax-Smith first entered public office in 1991. She served as Lord Mayor of Adelaide in 1997–2000.

At the 2002 state election she was elected a member of the South Australian House of Assembly for the seat of Adelaide, defeating the Liberal Party candidate Michael Harbison, who had been preselected after the retirement of the Liberal Party incumbent Michael Armitage. She retained the seat at the 2006 election with a 60 percent two-party vote but was defeated at the 2010 election by Liberal candidate Rachel Sanderson,
with a two-party preferred swing of 14.5 percent, the second-largest swing at that election.

She served as the South Australian State Minister for Education, Minister for Mental Health & Substance Abuse, Minister for Tourism, and Minister for the City of Adelaide between 2002 and 2010 in Premier Rann's Labor Government.

Later career
In October 2010 the Federal Minister for Tertiary Education, Senator Chris Evans, announced a Higher Education Base Funding Review, to be chaired by Lomax-Smith. The review was released in December 2011.

On 28 November 2010, the Royal Institution of Australia (RiAus) announced that Lomax-Smith was to act in the role of Director until a permanent appointment was made, but that she would not be an applicant for the permanent role.

On 18 August 2011 Premier Mike Rann announced that Lomax-Smith had been appointed as the new chair of the South Australian Museum board. She is on the Board of the Jam Factory, and TechInSA and in 2017 was made the Presiding Member of The South Australian Teachers Registration Board.

From 2016–2017, Lomax-Smith had a position on the Advisory Board of UCL Australia.

In 2015 she was commissioned by Premier Jay Weatherill to examine options for the post coal-mining future of Leigh Creek, a purpose-built mining town in the Northern Flinders Ranges, and wrote a report entitled Leigh Creek Futures.

On 3 June 2020, Lomax-Smith  was announced as new chair of the Don Dunstan Foundation, taking over from Lynn Arnold, who had held the position for 10 years and remains on the Board as Director and Patron.

On 14 November 2022, Lomax-Smith defeated incumbent Lord Mayor Sandy Verschoor and politician Rex Patrick to become Lord Mayor of Adelaide again after 22 years.

Personal life
Lomax-Smith is married with two children, and lives in Adelaide.

References

External links

Personal Site of Jane Lomax-Smith
Analysis of Base Funding Review Panel Report
 

Mayors and Lord Mayors of Adelaide
Members of the South Australian House of Assembly
1950 births
Living people
Women mayors of places in South Australia
Australian Labor Party members of the Parliament of South Australia
21st-century Australian politicians
21st-century Australian women politicians
Women members of the South Australian House of Assembly
Members of the Order of Australia